Serilingampally, also known as Lingampally, is a major suburb located in the north western part of Hyderabad City. It is the headquarters of the Serilingamapally mandal in the Ranga Reddy district of the Indian state of Telangana It is administered by the Greater Hyderabad Municipal Corporation (GHMC). Due to its close proximity to Hitech City, Gachibowli, Nanakramguda, Manikonda and Kondapur, there has been a heavy influx of IT companies. University of Hyderabad (UoH) is also located here.

Demographics 
 India census, Serilingampally had a population of 153,364 composed of 32,642 households. This population contains 79,225 males and 74,139 females.  census, Serilingampally has an average literacy rate of 42%, lower than the national average of 59.5%: male literacy is 42%, and female literacy is 41%. In Serilingampally, 11% of the population is under 6 years of age.

Industries 
Patancheru, an industrial area in Medak district, is about 6 km from this area. ALIND (Aluminum Industries) is a private company near the railway station on the road towards Mehdipatnam. Indian Immunologicals (serum and vaccine unit), State Bank Institute for Rural Banking, University of Hyderabad and International Institute of Information Technology are in Gachibowli area just 4 to 5 km away from Lingampally railway station. It is very close to the Bharat Heavy Electricals, Ramachandrapuram unit and is also located off the National Highway 65 leading to Pune.

Transport 

Lingampally has an MMTS train station, which is also its terminus, i.e., the train concludes its journey coming from Hyderabad and Falaknuma/ Secunderabad. Buses run by the TSRTC connect it to major parts of the city.

Politics 
MLA of Serilingampally constituency is Arekapudi Gandhi elected in the 2014 and 2018 general election and won from Telugu Desam Party and Bharat Rashtra Samithi parties, respectively. 

Former MLA is M Bikshapathi Yadav from 2009 to 2014.

Education 
There are several schools, such as 
 Vidya Niketan Model High School, Old Lingampally
 Sahithi Vidya Niketan High school
 Vidyanjali high School
 ZPHS Lingampally
 Vidya Vani School
 Kalam Anji Reddy School
Sri Chaitanya Techno School

Notable people 

 Maraboina Bikshapathi Yadav, Former MLA (2009-2014) United Andhra Pradesh Assembly

References 

Cities and towns in Ranga Reddy district
Neighbourhoods in Hyderabad, India